Mirabella is a genus of flowering plant in the family Cactaceae, native to Brazil. The genus was erected by Friedrich Ritter in 1979. It has also been treated as the subgenus Mirabella of the genus Cereus.

Species
, Plants of the World Online accepted the following species:

References

Cactoideae
Cactaceae genera